Paskalev,  is a masculine Bulgarian surname,  its feminine counterpart is Paskaleva. Notable people with the surname include: 

Anton Paskalev, (born 1958), Bulgarian pole vaulter
Mikhael Paskalev (born 1987), Norwegian singer-songwriter and musician of Bulgarian origin
Katya Paskaleva (born 1945), Bulgarian film and stage actress
Tsvetana Paskaleva, Armenian journalist of Bulgarian descent

Bulgarian-language surnames